Paul Schultz Martin (born in Allentown, Pennsylvania, 1928 - died in Tucson, Arizona September 13, 2010) was an American geoscientist at the University of Arizona who developed the theory that the Pleistocene extinction of large mammals worldwide was caused by overhunting by humans. Martin's work bridged the fields of ecology, anthropology, geosciences, and paleontology.

In 1953, Martin received his bachelor's degree in zoology from Cornell University. In 1953 and 1956 he completed his master's and doctorate programs at the University of Michigan and then proceeded with postdoctoral research at the Yale University and the University of Montreal. Martin's early interest embraced ornithology and herpetology and he conducted extensive fieldwork from 1948 to 1953 in Tamaulipas, Mexico. He published biogeographys on the birds of the Sierra de Tamaulipas and the herpetofauna of the Gómez Farias (= El Cielo) region of Tamaulipas, the latter considered "a classic treatise in historical biogeography". A case of polio, contracted while doing undergraduate field work in Mexico, forced Martin to rely on a cane, which restricted but did not end his field work. He joined the faculty of the University of Arizona in 1957 and worked there until his retirement in 1989.

Overkill hypothesis

The overkill hypothesis was proposed in 1966 by Paul S. Martin in a paper published in the journal Nature. Martin wrote, "The chronology of the extinction — first in Africa, second in America, finally in Madagascar — and the intensity of the extinction — moderate in Africa, heavier in America, and extremely heavy in Madagascar ... seems clearly related to the spread of human beings, to their cultural development, and to the vulnerabilities of the faunas they encountered."

Martin theorized that between 13,000 and 11,000 years ago newly arriving humans hunted to extinction North America's Ice Age large mammals, including ground sloths, camels, mammoths and mastodons, to extinction. The theory, summarized in Martin's 2005 book, Twilight of the Mammoths: Ice Age Extinctions and the Rewilding of America, has been controversial and thus widely examined (both criticized and supported) in academic papers.

Early critics of the overkill hypothesis were researchers in the field of archeology (Louis Leakey and Donald Grayson) and the geosciences (Russell Graham). The former focused on disagreements about human capabilities and expansions out of Africa. In geosciences, the focus was on the scale, speed, ecological effects, and biodiversity consequences of climate change during the Pleistocene glacial and interglacial periods. Prior to Martin's overkill idea, the mainstream scientific understanding of Pleistocene and Holocene extinction causes was climate change.

Martin later developed an ancillary hypothesis focusing on the speed of human entry into and saturation of a frontier landscape. This, he called the “blitzkrieg model”, which, similar to the ideas of Russian climatologist Mikhail I. Budyko, relates the sudden demise of large mammal populations on different continents and at different times to the arrival of humans. Martin proposed that as humans migrated from Africa and Eurasia to Australia, the Americas, and the islands of the Pacific, the new arrivals rapidly hunted to extinction the large animals endemic to each continent and thus also naive in the presence of unfamiliar primates equipped with lethal projectiles. Martin particularly focused his research on North America, whose late Ice Age fauna rivaled that of Africa today.

Martin sometimes faced criticism from archaeologists and paleontologists who claimed earlier dates for human arrival in the Americas or later dates for certain extinct animals than the overkill theory would suggest. Martin maintained that such claims were the result of faulty scientific analysis and pointed out that no such dates had yet been independently verified.

Martin's over-hunting hypothesis is still controversial. Several pre-Clovis sites are accepted by most workers, such as Topper, Monte Verde, Paisley Caves and others; dating of these is still controversial. New research has shown that in Siberia mammoths lived together with human beings for around 30,000 years, yet they became extinct only when the last glacial age ended. In Madagascar, there are more studies that predates the human arrival in the isle of several millennia.

Rewilding
Martin also championed the concept of Pleistocene rewilding in which extinct North American Pleistocene fauna could be restored by establishing breeding populations of surviving animals from other continents such as llamas, camels, lions and cheetahs and introducing populations of animals analogous to extinct species, i.e., elephants for mammoths.

According to Vance Haynes, "unlike so many people who get infatuated with their own theories, he [Martin] spent his professional career inviting criticism. He put together two critical conferences about Pleistocene extinctions, and the volumes that came out of those were pace-setting."

Selected bibliography
 Birds and Biogeography of the Sierra de Tamaulipas, an Isolated Pine-Oak Habitat. The Wilson Bulletin. Vol. 66, No. 1: 38-57. (1954)
 A Biogeography of Reptiles and Amphibians in the Gómez Farias Region, Tamaulipas, Mexico. Miscellaneous Publications, Museum of Zoology University of Michigan, No. 101: 1-102. (1958)
 Pleistocene Ecology and Biogeography of North America. pages 375-420: in Carl L. Hubbs (editor). Zoogeography. Publication No. 52. American Association for the Advancement of Science, Washington, D.C. x, 509 pp. (1958)
 Prehistoric Overkill. pages 75–120: in Paul S. Martin and  H. E. Wright Jr. (editors), Pleistocene Extinctions: The Search for a Cause. Yale University Press. New Haven, Connecticut. 453 pp. (1967)
 The Discovery of America. Science 179: 969-974. (1973)
 Sloth Droppings. Natural History. August–September: 75-81. (1975)
 Prehistoric Oeverkill: The Global Model. pages 354-403: in Paul S. Martin and Richard G. Klein (editors). Quaternary Extinctions: A Prehistoric Revolution. University of Arizona Press. Tucson, Arizona. 892 pp. (1989) 
 Overview: Reflections on Prehistoric Turbulence. pages 247-268: in Conrad A. Istock and Robert S. Hoff (editors). Storm Over a Mountain Island: Conservation Biology and the Mt. Graham Affair. University of Arizona Press. Tucson, Arizona. 291 pp. (1995) 
 Twilight of the Mammoths: Ice Age Extinctions and the Rewilding of America. University of California Press. xv, 250 pp. (2005)

References

External links 
Anasazi Painted Pottery in Field Museum of Natural History.1940. Paul S. Martin & Elizabeth S. Willis
Mikhail Budyko. 1967. ""
 Paul S. Martin (1973). The Discovery of America. An early summary of Martin's overhunting hypothesis published in Science, vol. 179, issue 4077, Mar. 9, 1973 pp. 969–974.

American zoologists
American paleontologists
University of Arizona faculty
Cornell University College of Agriculture and Life Sciences alumni
Educators from Allentown, Pennsylvania
Scientists from Allentown, Pennsylvania
People from Tucson, Arizona
2010 deaths
1928 births
University of Michigan alumni
Geobiologists